The Canada U-17 men's national soccer team (also known as Canada Under-17s or Canada U-17s ) represents Canada in international soccer at this age level. They are overseen by the Canadian Soccer Association, the governing body for soccer in Canada. 

Many of Canada's current internationals have played at one or more of these age levels early in their career, often working with the same coaches and teammates throughout their progression into the senior squad.

The team has qualified for seven out of nineteen FIFA U-17 World Cups. 

The team also competes in the CONCACAF U-17 Championship.

Fixtures and recent results

The following is a list of match results from the previous 12 months, as well as any future matches that have been scheduled.

2022

2023

Players

Current squad
The following 20 players have been named in the final roster for the 2023 Concacaf Men’s Under-17 Championship that will be held in Guatemala from February 11-26, 2023.

''Caps and goals as of February 24, 2023, after the match against USA men's national U17 soccer team.

Recent call-ups
The following players have been called up for the team within the last twelve months.

 

  = Alternate player
  = Injured player
  = Preliminary squad

Competitive record

FIFA U-17 World Cup

CONCACAF U-17 Championship

Honours
CONCACAF Under-17 Championship
 Runners-up (1): 2011
 Third place (5): 1985, 1988, 1992, 1994, 2013

See also

 Canada men's national soccer team
 Canada men's national under-23 soccer team
 Canada men's national under-20 soccer team
 Canada men's national futsal team
 Soccer in Canada

References

External links
 

under-17
North American national under-17 association football teams